Thomas Carl Hartmann (born May 7, 1951) is an American radio personality, author, former psychotherapist, businessman, and progressive political commentator.  Hartmann has been hosting a nationally syndicated radio show, The Thom Hartmann Program, since 2003 and hosted a nightly television show, The Big Picture, between 2010 and 2017.

Early life
Hartmann was born in Grand Rapids, Michigan, one of four children of Jean and Carl Thomas Hartmann. His paternal grandparents were from Norway, and his other ancestry includes Welsh and English. He lived in Detroit at age two, and later grew up in Lansing, Michigan. Interested in politics from a young age, he was raised in a conservative, Midwestern household with a right-wing point of view. He campaigned with his staunch-Republican father for Barry Goldwater during the 1964 presidential election when he was thirteen. Although a "gifted" student, Hartmann was expelled from high school during tenth grade for starting a paper that protested the Vietnam War.  He later earned a GED.

Hartmann enrolled at Lansing Community College and transferred to Michigan State University, majoring in electrical engineering. In 1968, Hartmann opened his first business, a repair shop named "The Electronics Joint" located next to Michigan State University and became a part-time disc jockey at local country music station WITL-FM. With Students for a Democratic Society (SDS), Hartmann protested against the Vietnam War. Hartmann had been interested in consciousness and spirituality since childhood, and by 1969 his interest evolved from hippie subculture to Christian mysticism. During that year, he met the head of the Coptic Center, Master Stanley. In 1971 he was ordained as a Minister with Coptic Fellowship International. He has been a keynote speaker at many Coptic Conferences nationally. In 1973, Hartmann returned to Detroit to work as an engineer with RCA.

Business career 
Hartmann began his business career in the early 1970s while in his 20s, co-founding The Woodley Herber Company. Woodley Herber sold herbal products, potpourris and teas, and operated until 1978. During this time, Hartmann obtained three degrees in herbology and homeopathic medicine. Hartmann moved to New Hampshire to start The New England Salem Children's Village, which still operates in Rumney, New Hampshire. He was its Executive Director for five years, and on the board of directors for more than 25 years. NESCT's child-care model was based on the German Salem International organization, and through his affiliation with that group, he helped start international relief programs in Uganda, Colombia, Russia, Israel, India, Australia, and several other countries between 1979 and today.

Hartmann founded International Wholesale Travel and its retail subsidiary Sprayberry Travel in Atlanta in 1983, a business which in the intervening years generated over a quarter of a billion dollars in revenue.  According to their website, Sprayberry Travel was lauded by the Wall Street Journal in 1984 as one of the early adopters of frequent travel programs analogous to the recent frequent flyer programs of the airline industry. He sold his share in the business in 1986, and retired with his family to Germany to work with the international relief organization Salem International. In the late 1970s, he was a trainer in advertising and marketing for The American Marketing Centers (now defunct), and in 1987, after returning from Germany, founded the Atlanta advertising agency Chandler, MacDonald, Stout, Schneiderman & Poe, Inc., doing business as The Newsletter Factory. He sold his interest in that company in 1996, and re-retired to Vermont.

Talk radio career 

Having worked as a DJ and news director at Lansing radio stations from 1968 to 1978, Hartmann started a radio show in February 2003 on a local station in Vermont; a month later it was picked up on the I.E. America Radio Network and on Sirius Satellite Radio. In 2005, he moved from Vermont to Oregon and, in addition to continuing his national show, also co-hosted a local talk show in Portland, Oregon (with Carl Wolfson, the late Heidi Tauber, and later Christine Alexander), from 2005 until early 2007 on KPOJ, initially an affiliate of Air America Radio owned by Clear Channel Communications. But KPOJ now (March 2013) airs a sports talk format, and is affiliated with Fox Sports Radio.

Hartmann's national program, on the air since 2003 and now in the noon to 3 pm. ET daypart, was chosen by Air America to replace Al Franken on most Air America affiliates in 2007. From 2008 to 2011, Talkers Magazine rated Hartmann the most popular liberal talk show host in America, rising from number 10 among all talk show hosts in 2008 to number 8 in 2011 and 2015. According to his then-syndicator Dial Global, more people listened to Hartmann's show on more stations than any other progressive talk show in America. The Thom Hartmann Program is estimated by industry magazine Talkers to have 7 million unique listeners per week.

As of March 2016, the show was carried on 80 terrestrial radio stations in 37 states, as well as on SiriusXM Progress channel 127. A community radio station in Africa, Radio Builsa in Ghana, also broadcasts the show. Various local cable TV stations simulcast the program. In addition to Westwood One, the show is now also offered via Pacifica Audioport to non-profit stations in a non-profit compliant format and is simulcast on Dish Network channel 9415 and DirecTV channel 348 via Free Speech TV. The program also airs in London, England.

Many guests appear on the show expressing a variety of points of view on diverse social and political topics. Some guests proffer progressive views similar to Hartmann's, but more than half are conservatives, libertarians, or Ayn Rand Institute members who espouse opposing views. Due to his eagerness to invite people who disagree with him, vigorous discussion and debate between the host and guests usually ensues; "My goal in my conversations with conservatives is not to create a spectacle, and not to win the argument, not to prove that I'm the smartest guy in the room or that I'm a tough warrior and I can smack down people." For many years, Sen. Bernie Sanders (I-VT) appeared every Friday for the "Brunch with Bernie" segment. Other regular phone-in guests include Congressmen Mark Pocan (Mid-day with Mark) and Ro Khanna, both members of the Congressional Progressive Caucus. Ellen Ratner of the Talk Radio News Service provides Washington commentary daily. Victoria Jones who is the White House correspondent for Talk Radio News Service appears occasionally, as does Ravi Batra, an economics professor at SMU.

Like most talk radio shows, The Thom Hartmann Program takes calls from listeners. When callers asked Hartmann how he was, he used to reply, "I'm great, but I'll get better." But after a time, callers would regularly try to elicit this response, so he's stopped replying this way routinely. Hartmann ends each show with the phrase, "Activism begins with you, democracy begins with you. Get out there, get active! Tag, you're it!"

Michael Harrison, publisher of radio industry trade magazine Talkers, offered this appraisal of Hartmann:

TV program
Hartmann hosted a one-hour daily TV show at 7 pm. ET Monday to Friday, The Big Picture with Thom Hartmann, which was editorially directed by his wife and was broadcast from the Washington, D.C., studios of the RT America news network. The show featured many conservative guests who routinely sparred with Hartmann. Hartmann co-produced the program with RT, who provided studio and carriage, while Hartmann retained full editorial control of his programming. The RT network aired the program via Dish Network, DirecTV, and on selected local-origination and public-access television cable TV channels globally. After hosting the program for seven years, Hartmann announced his departure as host on September 29, 2017.

Other areas of notability 
Hartmann is a writer, publishing more than twenty books on diverse topics. The title with the most critical acclaim is The Last Hours of Ancient Sunlight. In 1999, he was invited by the Dalai Lama to spend a week in Dharamsala after the Dalai Lama finished reading this book. Hartmann won the Project Censored Award in 2004 for Unequal Protection. As a result of a book on spirituality, The Prophet's Way, he was invited in 1998 to meet Pope John Paul II.

Trained in the 1970s in Neuro-Linguistic Programming by Richard Bandler (Hartmann is licensed by Bandler's Society of NLP as both an NLP Practitioner and an NLP Trainer, and Bandler wrote the foreword to his book Healing ADD), Hartmann popularized some of its concepts in Cracking the Code (2007), arguing Newt Gingrich and Frank Luntz made use of them in the 1980s and 1990s for Republican Party causes, and advocates using them to advance liberalism. His book Healing ADD also leans heavily on NLP techniques. Co-authored with Lamar Waldron, Hartmann's Ultimate Sacrifice released in 2005 states the Mafia ordered the assassination of John F. Kennedy and Lee Harvey Oswald was a CIA agent and patsy.

Hartmann was one of several contributors to Air America, the Playbook, a 300-plus page collection of essays, transcripts, and interviews by liberal radio personalities. It was published shortly before the 2006 Congressional elections, and was on The New York Times Best Seller List for October 8, 2006.

Leonardo DiCaprio made a web movie titled Before The Flood, inspired by The Last Hours of Ancient Sunlight. Hartmann appears in DiCaprio's 2007 documentary The 11th Hour, as well as the feature documentary film Dalai Lama Renaissance (with Harrison Ford), and Crude Impact. In 2010, Warner Brothers and Leonardo DiCaprio announced they are making a motion picture based on the book Legacy of Secrecy, authored by Lamar Waldron and Hartmann. Hartmann also narrated the 2011 documentary film Heist: Who Stole the American Dream?

In September 2013, Hartmann was granted an honorary Doctorate of Humane Letters from Goddard College in Port Townsend, Washington. According to President Barbara Vacarr, "Thom's work as a journalist, author, and community activist is a living example of the very mission of Goddard College, and what our students are committed to—advancing cultures of rigorous inquiry, collaboration, and lifelong-learning, where individuals take imaginative and responsible action."

Hartmann served on the board of Voqal, a collaboration of EBS licensees working to advance social equity.

Political views 
Hartmann is considered to have progressive/liberal politics, although he describes himself as part of the radical middle. His books include Unequal Protection: The Rise of Corporate Dominance and the Theft of Human Rights, in which he argues that the 1886 U.S. Supreme Court decision in Santa Clara County v. Southern Pacific Railroad Company (118 U.S. 394) did not actually grant corporate personhood, and that this doctrine derives from a mistaken interpretation of a Supreme Court clerk's notes. Hartmann considers this a clear contradiction of the intent of the Founding Fathers of the United States. He has also written on the separation of church and state, drawing upon The Federalist Papers to argue that the Founding Fathers warned against the notion of the United States being a Christian nation. He contends that the 2000 American election and 2004 American election were stolen through electronic tampering, denial of the voting franchise by rigged voting lists, and limiting availability of voting machines in selected precincts. He also accused the Bush administration of eroding democracy and individual freedoms.

Hartmann is a vocal critic of the effects of neoliberal globalization on the U.S. economy, claiming that economic policies enacted during and since the presidency of Ronald Reagan have led, in large part, to many American industrial enterprises' being acquired by multinational firms based in overseas countries, leading in many cases to manufacturing jobs—once considered a major foundation of the U.S. economy—being relocated to countries in Asia and other areas where the costs of labor are lower than in the U.S. and the concurrent reversal of the United States' traditional role of a leading exporter of finished manufactured goods to that of a primary importer of finished manufactured goods (exemplified by massive trade deficits with countries such as China). Hartmann argues that this phenomenon is leading to the erosion of the American middle class, whose survival Hartmann deems critical to the survival of American democracy. This argument is expressed in Hartmann's 2006 book, Screwed: The Undeclared War Against The Middle Class and What We Can Do About It. One of the book's main arguments is that media deregulation leads to corporate media's shifting the American consensus towards the acceptance of privatization and massive corporate profits—which causes the shrinking of the middle class.

In a 2013 interview with Politico, Hartmann described his political philosophy as democratic socialism:

Personal life
Hartmann has three children with his wife Louise. Hartmann has been a vegetarian since he was a teenager.

Attention-deficit hyperactivity disorder 

Hartmann has written about attention-deficit hyperactivity disorder (ADHD) and adult attention-deficit disorder (AADD), and has proposed (in 1978, published in 1992) the hunter vs. farmer hypothesis, suggesting that ADHD is an expected evolutionary adaptation to hunting lifestyles where individuals have the ability to rapidly shift focus and external attention, while holding multiple trains of thought. This ability, Hartmann theorizes, causes difficulties for those who live and work in cultures in which "farming"—planned, predictable, organized, repetitive behaviors—is typical. His first book on the disorder, Attention Deficit Disorder: a Different Perception was described by Scientific American as "innovative and fresh". Hartmann has established specialized schools for children with ADHD, such as The Hunter School in Rumney, New Hampshire, which he co-founded with his wife Louise.

He also operated the "ADD Forum" and "DeskTop Publishing Forum", along with several others, on CompuServe.

Bibliography 

 1992 (first edition): 
 1993: 
 1994: 
 1994: 
 1995: 
 1996: 
 1996:  by Thom Hartmann and Jane Bowman, with Susan Burgess
 1997 (2004 revised ed.): 
 1998 (2004 revised ed.): 
 1998: 
 2000: 
 2000: 
 2003: 
 2004: 
 2004: 
 2004 (revised ed.): 
 2005:  by Lamar Waldron, with Thom Hartmann
 2006: 
 2006: 
 2007: 
 2008: 
 2009: 
 2010 (second edition): 
 2011: 
 2013: 
 2013: 
 2019: The Hidden History of Guns and the Second Amendment Penguin Random House 
 2019: 
 2020: The Hidden History of the War on Voting: Who Stole Your Vote and How to Get It Back Berrett-Koehler Publishers 
 2020: 
 2021: 
 2021:

References

External links 

 . Includes information on and streaming of the radio and TV shows, essays, chatroom, and a discussion board.
 Episodes of The Big Picture on YouTube
 Thom Hartmann with the Dalai Lama Videos made during the filming of the documentary Dalai Lama Renaissance.
 "When Democracy Fails" Podcast on Google Video.
 
 C-SPAN Q&A interview with Hartmann, February 7, 2010

1951 births
20th-century American non-fiction writers
20th-century American philosophers
21st-century American non-fiction writers
21st-century American philosophers
Air America (radio network)
American alternative journalists
American broadcast news analysts
American Christian socialists
American democracy activists
American democratic socialists
American economics writers
American environmentalists
American financial writers
American health activists
American humanitarians
American male journalists
American male non-fiction writers
American people of Norwegian descent
American political journalists
American political writers
American psychology writers
American self-help writers
American spiritual writers
American talk radio hosts
Attention deficit hyperactivity disorder researchers
Critics of conspiracy theories
Critics of neoconservatism
Critics of Objectivism (Ayn Rand)
Environmental philosophers
Free speech activists
Journalists from Michigan
Journalists from New Hampshire
Journalists from Oregon
Journalists from Vermont
Journalists from Washington, D.C.
Living people
Mass media theorists
Nautilus Book Award winners
People from Merrimack, New Hampshire
People from Rumney, New Hampshire
Philosophers of culture
Philosophers of economics
Philosophers of education
Philosophers of social science
Political philosophers
Progressive talk radio
Radio personalities from Portland, Oregon
Radio personalities from Washington, D.C.
American social commentators
Social philosophers
Writers about activism and social change
Writers from Atlanta
Writers from Burlington, Vermont
Writers from Detroit
Writers from Grand Rapids, Michigan
Writers from Lansing, Michigan
20th-century American male writers
21st-century American male writers